Brunvand is a surname. Notable people with the surname include:

Jan Harold Brunvand (born 1933), American folklorist
Olav Brunvand (1912–1988), Norwegian newspaper editor and politician
Per Brunvand (1937–2015), Norwegian newspaper editor, son of Olav

Norwegian-language surnames